Daniel Radcliffe is an English actor who has appeared on film, television and stage. He is best known for playing the role of Harry Potter in the film series of the same name between 2001 and 2011.

Film

Television

Stage

Music videos

Other

References 

Male actor filmographies
American filmographies
British filmographies